Events in the year 2020 in Serbia.

Incumbents
 President: Aleksandar Vučić
 Prime Minister: Ana Brnabić

Events

21 June – 2020 Serbian parliamentary election.

Deaths

10 January – Neda Arnerić, actress (b. 1953).
15 January – Milovan Stepandić, basketball coach (b. 1954).
26 June – Ilija Petković, Serbian footballer and manager (b. 1945)
31 July – Miodrag Živković, sculptor (b. 1928).
7 August – Michael Ojo, Nigerian-American basketball player (b. 1993)

References

 
2020s in Serbia
Years of the 21st century in Serbia
Serbia
Serbia